Kouloughlis, also spelled Koulouglis, Cologhlis and Qulaughlis (from Turkish Kuloğlu "Children of The Empire Servants" from Kul "soldier" or "servant" + Oğlu "son of"), but the translation of the word "kul" as slave is misleading since in the Ottoman context, it referred to one’s special status as being in the special service of the sultan. It was a term used during the period of Ottoman influence in North Africa that usually designated the mixed offspring of Ottoman officials and janissaries, and local North African women.

Definition 
The world Kouloughli or Kuloglu referred to children of Janissaries and local women. While other sources refer to Kouloughlis as children of any Ottoman man and a North African woman, it was only those from acemi ocagi or devshirme that could become Kul or Kouloughli, in fact it had been a rule to not make anyone other than those who were coming from devshirme or acemi ocagi to be the “kul” of the sultan.

The title of Kouloughli went from father to child. For example Ahmed Bey of Constantine was the son of a Kouloughli, and thus he himself was a Kouloughli. Because of this, many Kouloughli families independent of Native North African and Turkish ones formed.

Migration to North Africa
According to the Turco-Libyan historian Orhan Koloğlu, throughout the 400 years of Ottoman rule in the Maghreb and more generally North Africa, the Ottoman administration ensured that Ottoman soldiers from the Odjak of Tripoli, formed at least 5% of the regions population in Ottoman Tripolitania. In other territories such as the Regency of Algiers the number of Janissaries progressively got lower. During the 17th century for example more than 12,000 janissaries were stationed in Algiers, but by 1800 only 4,000 Janissaries were Turks, with the majority of the Janissaries being composed Kouloughlis, renegades, and some Algerians. In the Regency of Tunis, especially during the later era of the Beylik of Tunis janissaries were less used, and were replaced by more modern infantry units and Mamluks. Turkish-speaking Anatolians were considered to be the ideal migrants to ensure the Turkification of the region. Furthermore, the authorities initially placed a ban on Turkish speakers from using the Arabic language; this allowed the Turkish language to remain the prestigious language of the region till the nineteenth century. Koloğlu has estimated that approximately 1 million Ottoman soldiers from Anatolia, and the Balkans migrated to the Regency of Algiers, the Regency of Tunis, and Ottoman Tripolitania, usually departing from the port of Izmir. The majority of these troops arrived during the 16th, and 17th century, and by the 18th and 19th century their numbers were lower.

Ottoman women in North Africa
Although the term "köleoğlu" implied the term "son of", the Turkish population in North Africa was not solely made up of men. Indeed, Ottoman women also migrated to the region, although in much lower numbers than men. There also existed Kouloughlis born of North African men, and Turkish women, such as Ibn Hamza al-Maghribi, an Algerian mathematician.  Moreover, the offspring of Turkish men and North African women would have included females too. Up until the dissolution of the Ottoman Empire, many upper-class women in Libya were of Turkish origins. This Turkish elite held a deep kinship for the Ottoman state, which increased further during the Italo-Turkish War in favour of the Ottoman state.

Legacy

Religion
The majority of Turkish-speaking Ottoman Muslims adhered to the Hanafi school of Islam, in contrast to the majority of the North African subjects, who followed the Maliki school.  Today the Hanafi school is still followed by the descendants of Turkish families who remain in the region. Traditionally, their mosques are in the Ottoman architectural style and are particularly identifiable from their Turkish-style octagonal minarets.

Language
Words and expressions from the Turkish language, to varying degrees, are still used in most varieties of the Maghrebi derjas and  spoken Arabic in North Africa and the Middle East. For example, in Algeria an estimated 634 Turkish words are still used today in Algerian Arabic. Approximately 800 to 1,500 Turkish loanwords are still used in Egypt, in Egyptian Arabic, and between 200 and 500 in Libya and Tunisia, respectively in Libyan and Tunisian Arabic.  Turkish loanwords have also been influential in countries which were never conquered by the Ottomans, such as in Morocco, in Moroccan Arabic. Furthermore, the Turks also introduced words from the Persian language to the region, which were originally borrowed for the Ottoman Turkish language.

The majority of Turkish loanwords in Arabic are used for private life (such as food and tools), law and government, and the military.

Food
Ottoman rule left a profound influence on the cuisine of North Africa, the Middle East, and the Balkans. Hence, even today, many dishes produced in different countries throughout these regions are derived from the same name, usually a variation of a Turkish word (such as baklava and dolma).

Tools

Military

Other words

Arts and literature
The capital of the Ottoman Empire, Constantinople (Istanbul), was the central location where specialists in art, literature, and the scientists from all over the provinces would gather to present their work. Hence, many people were influenced here and would borrow from the masterpieces they came into contact with. Consequently, the Arabic language adopted several technical terms of Turkish origin as well as artistic influences.

Music
The cultural interaction between the Arabs and Turks influenced the music of the Arab provinces significantly. New maqamat in Arabic music emerged (i.e. Makam, a Turkish system of melody types), such as al-Hijazkar, Shahnaz and Naw’athar, as well as technical music terminologies.

Theatre
The Turks introduced the Karagöz puppet show, which concerns the adventures of two stock characters: Karagöz (meaning "black-eyed" in Turkish) and Hacivat (meaning "İvaz the Pilgrim"). Evening performances of the show are particularly popular during Ramadan in North Africa.

See also
Turkish minorities in the former Ottoman Empire
Turks in Algeria
Turks in Egypt
Turks in Libya
Turks in Tunisia
Maghrebis
Tunisian people
Pied-Noir
Arab-Berber

Notes

References

Bibliography 
 
.

.
.
 
.
 
.
.
.
.
.
.

.
.

People from the Ottoman Empire
Ethnic groups in Algeria
Ethnic groups in Libya
Ethnic groups in Tunisia
Turkish words and phrases
Turkish diaspora in Africa